Antroposthiidae is a family of acoels, containing three genera and four species:

Taxonomy

Genera
There are three genera in the family Antroposthiidae.
Antroposthia Faubel, 1974
Convoluella Faubel, 1974
Unantra Faubel, 1976

Species
There are four species in the family Actinoposthiidae.

References

Acoelomorphs
Animal families